The Sultan Abdul Aziz Royal Gallery is a gallery in Klang District, Selangor, Malaysia. The gallery is about the former Selangor Sultan Salahuddin Abdul Aziz Shah. The Royal Gallery is currently chaired by then nephew of Salahuddin of Selangor, Tengku Indera Pahlawan Diraja Selangor (Yang Amat Dihormati Tengku Dato' Setia Putra Alhaj bin Tengku Azman Shah Alhaj).

History
The museum building was initially constructed as Sultan Sulaeman Building in 1909. During the British Malaya, the British government used the building as the land and administration office. During the Japanese rule of Malaya, it was used as war headquarter. After the independence of Malaya in 1957, it was used as Klang District office. The museum was initially opened in 1988 as the Memorial Museum. The gallery was officiated on 19 October 2007 by Sultan Sharafuddin.

Architecture
The museum is housed in a two-story building which was designed by British architect Arthur Benison Hubback.

Exhibitions
The gallery displays the history and heritage of Sultanate of Selangor since 1766 from more than 2,000 artifacts.

Transportation
The gallery is accessible within walking distance south of Klang Komuter station.

See also
 List of tourist attractions in Selangor
 Sultan of Selangor

References

External links

 

2007 establishments in Malaysia
Buildings and structures in Selangor
Klang District
Art museums and galleries in Malaysia
Tourist attractions in Selangor